China Gate Castle Park is a park in Nanjing, Jiangsu province, China. It is located north of the Qinhai River, south of the Nanjing City Wall and near the Changgan Bridge. Entrance to the treelined riverside park is gained through the China Gate.

The City of Nanjing has identified it as one of the top five parks in the city. Others are Mochou Lake Park, Qingliangshan Park, Wuchaomen Park and Xuanwu Lake.

References

Parks in Nanjing